Davis Burleson (born March 25, 2002) is an American host most known for hosting his TikTok interview series, "What’s Poppin? With Davis!!" Along with being a social media personality, he is a host on Sirius XM TikTok Radio.

Life 
Burleson's first job was a DoorDash driver. In March 2020, Burleson of Houston began posting on TikTok at the age of 17. He amassed 100,000 followers by the fall of 2020 when he moved to New York City to study photography at the Eugene Lang College of Liberal Arts at The New School. Burleson partnered with Fallen Media, a Flatiron based short-form content studio to assist with the production of "What’s Poppin? With Davis!" The series features Burleson interviewing visitors of Washington Square Park. Episode 55 was the first to go viral with over 22 million views and bringing another 100,000 followers that same week. In the spring of 2022, Burleson was hired by Ganni during Copenhagen Fashion Week to post content on Instagram and TikTok. He hosted a backstage stream on TikTok at the 64th Annual Grammy Awards. By September 2022, Burleson's show had 2.1 million TikTok followers.

References 

2002 births
Living people
American TikTokers
American male bloggers
LGBT TikTokers
LGBT people from Texas
LGBT people from New York (state)
Entertainers from Houston
American LGBT entertainers
Eugene Lang College alumni
Place of birth missing (living people)
21st-century American LGBT people